Patrick D. Moore (born 1867) was an Irish Gaelic footballer who played for the Cork senior team.

Moore made his first appearance for the team during the 1889 championship and was a regular member of the starting fifteen for the next two seasons. During that time he won one All-Ireland medal and one Munster medal.

At club level Moore was a double county championship medalist with Midleton.

References

1867 births
Midleton Gaelic footballers
Cork inter-county Gaelic footballers
Winners of one All-Ireland medal (Gaelic football)
Year of death missing